Ahmadabad-e Esfandiyari (also Romanized as Aḩmadābād-e Esfandīyārī) is a village in Ganjabad Rural District, Esmaili District, Anbarabad County, Kerman Province, Iran. At the 2006 census, its population was 191, in 47 families.

References 

Populated places in Anbarabad County